Gennadii Genus (born ) is a Ukrainian male  track cyclist. He competed in the 1 km time trial event at the 2013 UCI Track Cycling World Championships.

References

External links
 Profile at cyclingarchives.com

1990 births
Living people
Ukrainian track cyclists
Ukrainian male cyclists
Place of birth missing (living people)